Lofentanil is one of the most potent opioid analgesics known and is an analogue of fentanyl, which was developed in 1960. It is most similar to the highly potent opioid carfentanil (4-carbomethoxyfentanyl), only slightly more potent. Lofentanil can be described as 3-methylcarfentanil, or 3-methyl-4-carbomethoxyfentanyl. While 3-methylfentanyl is considerably more potent than fentanyl itself, lofentanil is only slightly stronger than carfentanil. This suggests that substitution at both the 3 and 4 positions of the piperidine ring introduces steric hindrance which prevents μ-opioid affinity from increasing much further. As with other 3-substituted fentanyl derivatives such as ohmefentanyl, the stereoisomerism of lofentanil is very important, with some stereoisomers being much more potent than others.

Lofentanil is very similar to carfentanil in effects, but has a longer duration of action. This makes it unsuitable for most practical applications, with carfentanil being the preferred agent for tranquilizing large animals, and short-acting derivatives such as sufentanil or remifentanil being preferred for medical use in human surgical procedures. The long duration and high lipophilicity of lofentanil has been suggested as an advantage for certain types of analgesia, but the main application for lofentanil at the present time is research into opioid receptors. 
 
Side effects of lofentanyl analogs are similar to those of fentanyl itself, which include itching, nausea, and potentially serious respiratory depression, which can be life-threatening. Fentanyl analogs have killed hundreds of people throughout Europe and the former Soviet republics since the most recent resurgence in use began in Estonia in the early 2000s, and novel derivatives continue to appear. Side effects from lofentanil might be particularly problematic given its reportedly long duration of action. Another side effect which is characteristic of fentanyl and its derivatives is their tendency to rapidly induce tolerance, due to their high binding affinity triggering rapid internalization of chronically activated opiate receptors. This might be expected to be a particular problem with lofentanil as it is not only one of the most potent drugs in the series, but also is longer acting than most other fentanyl analogues, meaning that development of tolerance triggered by receptor over-activation could be rapid.
 
In addition to acting on the μ-opioid receptor, lofentanil has also been found to act as a full agonist of the κ-opioid receptor (Ki = 8.2 nM; EC50 = 153 nM; Emax = 100%).

See also
 Opioid potency comparison

References 

Synthetic opioids
Piperidines
Carboxylate esters
Anilines
Propionamides
Mu-opioid receptor agonists
Janssen Pharmaceutica
Kappa-opioid receptor agonists
Fentanyl